Business is the activity of making one's living or making money by producing or buying-and-selling goods or services.

Business may also refer to:

 a business: an organization (company or enterprise, for example) involved in the trade of goods, services, or both, with consumers
 the business sector – the combined activity of all company-based trading and industrial activity in an economy
 trade, the transfer of the ownership of goods or services from one person or entity to another in exchange for other goods or services or for money
 an individual industry, such as "the meat business" or "the oil business"
 an individual line of business within an industry, such as "the bacon business" within "the meat business" or "a ball-bearing line" within "a bearing business"
 Business studies
 Business (EP), an EP by Jet Lag Gemini
 Business (newspaper), a weekly business newspaper in Ukraine
 "Business" (song), a single by Eminem
 Business (TV channel), Ukrainian TV channel
 Business (film), a 1960 French film
 business class on airlines
 business route, a type of highway in North America
 a group of ferrets
 Business, a term used in Australian Aboriginal English in a distinctive way to mean matters
Secret women's business, pertaining to a controversy about the building of a bridge
Sorry business, mourning or funeral practices

See also
 The Business (disambiguation)
 Business as usual (disambiguation)